Lepidiolamprologus variostigma is a species of cichlid endemic to Lake Tanganyika where it is usually found around 45 meters. It is found on the Democratic Republic of the Congo coast line. This species can reach a length of  TL.  This species can also be found in the aquarium trade.

References

Büscher, H.H., 1995. Ein neuer Cichlide von der zairischen Küste des Tanganjikasees Neolamprologus variostigma n. sp. (Cichlidae, Lamprologini). Datz 48(12):794–797.

variostigma
Taxa named by Heinz Heinrich Büscher
Fish described in 1995
Fish of Lake Tanganyika